Rainer Goltzsche (born 4 September 1936) is a Swiss former freestyle swimmer. He competed in two events at the 1960 Summer Olympics.

References

External links
 

1936 births
Living people
Swiss male freestyle swimmers
Olympic swimmers of Switzerland
Swimmers at the 1960 Summer Olympics
Sportspeople from Zürich
20th-century Swiss people